Andrea Camassei (November 1602 – 1649) was an Italian Baroque painter and engraver mainly active in Rome under the patronage of the Barberini.

Biography
He was born in Bevagna in Umbria to parents of modest means, Angelina d' Anton Maria Angeli and Lorenzo. He was active in painting in the Palazzo Barberini as well as in Antonio Barberini's favored church, Santa Maria della Concezione, where he painted the Assumption of the Virgin on the dome. His training was under Domenichino, but he also labored under the direction of Sacchi and Pietro da Cortona. He painted a Triumph of Constantine for the Baptistery of the Lateran Palace. He painted for Taddeo Barberini, two large canvases (1638–39) depicting Massacre of the Niobids and Hunt of Diana. He also painted a Saints Bonaventura, Bernardino & Ludovico da Tolosa for Santa Caterina in Rapecchiano (Spello).

References

1602 births
1649 deaths
People from Bevagna
17th-century Italian painters
Italian male painters
Italian Baroque painters